South Fork is a former settlement in Butte County, California, USA. It lay at an elevation of 1375 feet (419 m). It still appeared on maps as of 1947, and was inundated by Lake Oroville.

Notes

External links

Former settlements in Butte County, California
Former populated places in California
Destroyed towns
Submerged settlements in the United States